Upper Tadong is a census town in Gangtok District in the Indian state of Sikkim. It falls under Gangtok Municipal Corporation.

Demographics
At the 2001 census of India, Upper Tadong had a population of 14,670. Males constitute 54% of the population and females 46%. Upper Tadong has an average literacy rate of 76%, higher than the national average of 59.5%: male literacy is 80%, and female literacy is 71%. In Upper Tadong, 10% of the population is under 6 years of age.

References

Cities and towns in Gangtok district